The Roaring Road may refer to:

 The Roaring Road (1919 film), American silent action romance film
 The Roaring Road (1926 film), American silent action film